The 2023 FISU Summer World University Games (Universiade), the 32nd edition of the event, were to be held in Yekaterinburg, Russia.

Postponement
The games were suspended in 2022 as result of the 2022 Russian invasion of Ukraine with FISU ruling that the event will not take place in the Russian city. Instead, the Chinese city of Chengdu, which was to have hosted in 2021 will now host in 2023.

To replace the suspended 2023 Summer World University Games, Russian authorities announced to host the first International University Sports Festival and participate in the third Russian-Chinese winter youth games instead.

Sports
Three sport is in 2023 addition.

 Aquatics
 
 
 
 
 
 
 
 
 
 
 Artistic gymnastics (14)
 Rhythmic gymnastics (8)

References

2023
Universiade Summer
2023 Summer Universiade
Sports events affected by the 2022 Russian invasion of Ukraine
Sport in Yekaterinburg
2023 in Russian sport